The Smyth County Community Hospital is a historic hospital building at 565 Radio Hill Road in Marion, Smyth County, Virginia.  It is a four-story steel-framed structure, finished in brick veneer, with a prominent five-story brick tower projecting at its center.  One and two-story additions have been added to various parts of the building.  Its built in 1965–67 to a design by Echols-Sparger & Associates, a local architectural firm, and was the first fully racially integrated hospital in southwestern Virginia.

The building was listed on the National Register of Historic Places in 2015.

See also
National Register of Historic Places listings in Smyth County, Virginia

References

Hospital buildings on the National Register of Historic Places in Virginia
Buildings and structures completed in 1967
Buildings and structures in Smyth County, Virginia
National Register of Historic Places in Smyth County, Virginia
1967 establishments in Virginia